Céleste Bulkeley (1759–1832) was a French soldier in the Catholic and Royal Army during the war in the Vendée. She is particularly known, being included as a heroine in many school books during the 19th century.

Notes

Sources 
L'histoire tragique de Céleste Bulkeley est racontée dans « Un Vendéen sous la Terreur », d’après le manuscrit de son frère Toussaint Ambroise Talour de la Cartrie ; ce manuscrit, aujourd'hui perdu, a d'abord été édité en anglais puis re-traduit en français par Pierre Amédée Pichot (édition de 1910 et fac-similé de 1988).
L'histoire de sa sœur Jeanne Ambroise, aussi très engagée dans l'insurrection vendéenne, est écrite dans « Madame de Sapinaud », réimpression de l'édition de 1823.

1759 births
1832 deaths
Women in 18th-century warfare
Royalist insurgents during the French Revolution
Military personnel of the War in the Vendée
Women in war in France
French counter-revolutionaries